Fritillaria messanensis is a European species of flowering plant in the lily family Liliaceae, native to southeastern Europe: Italy (Sicily, Calabria), Greece (incl. Crete), Albania, former Yugoslavia.

Subspecies
 Fritillaria messanensis subsp. gracilis (Ebel) Rix - Ionian Islands of Greece, Albania, Serbia, Croatia, Montenegro, Bosnia, Macedonia, Kosovo
 Fritillaria messanensis subsp. messanensis - Greece, Sicily, Calabria
 Fritillaria messanensis subsp. neglecta (Parl.) Nyman - Croatia, Macedonia
 Fritillaria messanensis subsp. sphaciotica (Gand.) Kamari & Phitos - Crete

References

External links
Alpine Garden Society Plant Encyclopaedia, Fritillaria messanensis
Flowers of Northwest Crete
Municipality of Sitia, Fritillaria messanensis - Phritilaria 

messanensis
Flora of Europe
Plants described in 1815
Taxa named by Constantine Samuel Rafinesque